The 1961 Indiana Hoosiers football team represented the Indiana Hoosiers in the 1961 Big Ten Conference football season. They participated as members of the Big Ten Conference. The Hoosiers played their home games at Seventeenth Street Stadium in Bloomington, Indiana. The team was coached by Phil Dickens, in his fourth year as head coach of the Hoosiers.

Schedule

References

Indiana
Indiana Hoosiers football seasons
Indiana Hoosiers football